"Southern Grace" is a song written by Porter Howell, Brady Seals and Stewart Harris, and recorded by American country music group Little Texas.  It was released in April 1995 as the third and final single from the album Kick a Little.  The song reached #27 on the Billboard Hot Country Singles & Tracks chart, making it the lowest charting single from the album.

Chart performance

References

1995 singles
1994 songs
Little Texas (band) songs
Songs written by Brady Seals
Warner Records singles
Songs written by Porter Howell
Songs written by Stewart Harris